Manmeet is a given name. Notable people and characters with the name include:
Manmeet Singh, an Indian actor and model 
Manmeet Bhullar, a Canadian politician and current Member of the Legislative Assembly of Alberta
Manmeet(Sacha Dhawan), a main character from OutSourced TV Series